"Little Bit O' Soul" is a song written in 1964 by British songwriters, John Carter and Ken Lewis. It was originally recorded by Coventry band, the Little Darlings, and released in 1965 on Fontana Records.

The Music Explosion version
In 1967, the song was popularized in the United States by the garage band, the Music Explosion, whose version went to No. 1 on the Record World 100 Top Pops chart.  "Little Bit O' Soul" went to No. 2 on the Billboard Hot 100. This song was the only hit for the Music Explosion.

The single was certified Gold by the Recording Industry Association of America for sales of one million copies. It later appeared on the album of the same name.

References

1964 singles
1967 singles
Songs written by John Carter (musician)
Songs written by Ken Lewis (songwriter)
The Music Explosion songs
Laurie Records singles
1964 songs